Man, You Should Explode is the third album from The Kill Devil Hills, released on 25 September 2009.

The album was recorded in January 2009 at Poons Head Studio,  Fremantle, with producer Burke Reid.

Track listing 
"It's Easy When You Don't Know How" – 3:05
"Cockfighter";– 3:54
"I Don't Think This Shit Can Last Much Longer" – 4:10
"Rosalie" – 3:29
"The White Lady" – 4:05
"Words From Robin To Batman" – 5:26
"When The Wolf Come" – 6:15
"Siam" – 4:15
"Cool My Desire" – 5:36
"Lucy-On-All-Fours" – 5:03

Reviews 

2006 albums
The Kill Devil Hills albums
Shock Records albums